Amand Julien Solbach (10 May 1904 – 17 December 1967) was a French gymnast. He competed at the 1928 Summer Olympics and the 1936 Summer Olympics. He was married to two-time Olympian Jeanette Vogelbacher (1922–2018), who competed in 1948 and 1952. A gymnasium is named in his honour in Châteaudun, where he died in 1967.

References

External links
 

1904 births
1967 deaths
French male artistic gymnasts
Olympic gymnasts of France
Gymnasts at the 1928 Summer Olympics
Gymnasts at the 1936 Summer Olympics
Sportspeople from Seine-Saint-Denis
20th-century French people